Thala Borivat District is a district located in Stung Treng Province, in north-east Cambodia along the Mekong river. According to the Cambodian census of 2019, it had a population of 36,925.

Visitors can stay at the Sok Sambath Hotel, one of the few hotels in the area. Available hospitals in the district are: Chamkar Leu Health Center, Preah Rumkel Health Center, Preah Rumkel, and Thala Bariwat Health Center.

Administration
The following table shows the villages of Thala Borivat District by commune.

References 

Districts of Stung Treng province